Jonathan Erlich and Fabrice Martin were the defending champions but chose not to defend their title.

Sander Arends and David Pel won the title after defeating Jonathan Eysseric and Robin Haase 6–3, 6–3 in the final.

Seeds

Draw

References

External links
 Main draw

Open Harmonie mutuelle - Doubles
2022 Doubles